Itapiranga may refer to two places in Brazil:

Itapiranga, Amazonas, a municipality in the state of Amazonas
Itapiranga, Santa Catarina, a municipality in the state of Santa Catarina

See also
Itaporanga (disambiguation)